Quản Bạ is a rural commune of Quản Bạ District, Hà Giang Province, Vietnam.

References

Populated places in Hà Giang province